Naver Pay (Hangul: 네이버 페이) is a mobile payment service launched by Naver Corporation. It is Naver's second mobile payment service after Line Pay, which was launched by Naver's Japanese subsidiary, Line Corporation in 2014.

Service
Naver Pay was launched on June 25, 2015 with support for 14 banks and 3 credit card companies as well as 53,000 member stores. The service allows both mobile payment services through the app and online checkout for online shopping similar to PayPal.

References

External links
Official website

Naver Corporation
Mobile payments in South Korea
Online payments